Ticonderoga Municipal Airport  is a public use airport located two nautical miles (4 km) northeast of Ticonderoga, a hamlet in the Town of Ticonderoga, Essex County, New York, United States. The airport is owned by the Town of Ticonderoga. It is included in the National Plan of Integrated Airport Systems for 2011–2015, which categorized it as a general aviation facility.

Facilities and aircraft 
Ticonderoga Municipal Airport covers an area of 60 acres (24 ha) at an elevation of 273 feet (83 m) above mean sea level. It has one runway designated 2/20 with an asphalt surface measuring 4,041 by 60 feet (1,232 x 18 m).

For the 12-month period ending September 9, 2011, the airport had 11,200 aircraft operations, an average of 30 per day: 98% general aviation and 2% military. At that time there were 11 aircraft based at this airport: 91% single-engine and 9% helicopter.

References

External links 
 Ticonderoga Municipal (4B6) at NYSDOT Airport Directory
 Aerial image as of May 1994 from USGS The National Map
 
 

Airports in New York (state)
Transportation buildings and structures in Essex County, New York